Divina Trace (1991) is an experimental novel by Robert Antoni, and the winner of the 1992 Commonwealth Writers Prize for best first novel.  It tells the story of the fictional island-nation of Corpus Christi coming into its own identity.  The central narrator, Johnny Domingo, relays the story of the mysterious Magdalena and her frog child, as he hears it from seven different narrators, each speaking their own distinctly Caribbean dialect. It utilizes drawings, pictures, and even a mirror.

1991 novels
Novels set in the Caribbean
1991 debut novels